Love Is an Action Word, released in 1998 on CGI Records, is a gospel music album by American urban contemporary gospel group Witness. This would be the only album to feature then new members Candace Smith and Ayana Thomas and would be the group's last release before disbanding in 1999. The band would later regroup in 2003.

Track listing 
"Never Let Go"
"Justified by Faith"
"I'll Reign"
"He's Standing By"
"Resting in Him"
"ABBA Father"
"Sing a Song"
"Walking in the Light"
"An Audience with the King"
"Love Is an Action Word"

Personnel
Lisa Page Brooks: Vocals 
Laeh Page: Vocals
Candace Smith: Vocals
Ayana Thomas: Vocals

Charts

References

1998 albums
Witness (gospel group) albums